There are several speedways/raceways/race tracks at state fairgrounds in the United States:

California State Fairgrounds Speedway; Sacramento, California
Indiana State Fairgrounds Speedway; Indianapolis, Indiana
Illinois State Fairgrounds Racetrack; Springfield, Illinois
Louisiana State Fair Speedway; Shreveport, Louisiana active from at least the 1920s until the 1970s
Michigan State Fairgrounds Speedway; Detroit, Michigan
Milwaukee Mile; West Allis, Wisconsin
Missouri State Fair Speedway; Sedalia, Missouri
Music City Motorplex; Nashville, Tennessee
Richmond International Raceway; Richmond, Virginia
State Fairgrounds Speedway, Raleigh, North Carolina